The Palestinian Basketball Federation is the governing body of basketball in Palestine.

The federation, founded in 1963, represents basketball with public authorities as well as with national and international sports organizations and as such with Palestine in international competitions. It is affiliated with FIBA and FIBA Asia. The federation also organizes the Palestine national basketball team and the Palestine women's national basketball team.

Leagues
Palestine Basketball League

References 

FIBA Profile

Basketball governing bodies in Asia
Sports organizations established in 1963